Imagining Indians is a 1992 documentary film produced and directed by Native American filmmaker, Victor Masayesva, Jr. (Hopi). The documentary attempts to reveal the misrepresentation of Indigenous Native American culture and tradition in Classical Hollywood films by interviews with different Indigenous Native American actors and extras from various tribes throughout the United States.

See also
 Portrayal of Native Americans in film
 Stereotypes of Native Americans in North America
Reel Injun (2009)
Playing Indian
Inventing the Indian (2012)

References
 Imagining Indians: Film information Retrieved on July 20, 2007
 Victor Masayesva, Jr.: Photography and film-making Basic Info Retrieved on March 14, 2010
 Hearne, Joanna. 2005. "John Wayne's teeth: Speech, sound and representation in "Smoke signals" and "Imagining Indians"." Western Folklore 64 (3/4): 189–208.

1992 films
American documentary films
Documentary films about Native Americans
Documentary films about Hollywood, Los Angeles
Documentary films about racism in the cinema of the United States
1992 documentary films
Native Americans in popular culture
1990s English-language films
1990s American films
English-language documentary films